Greg Porter is a Democratic member of the Indiana House of Representatives, representing the 96th District since 1992. He is a member of the Indiana Black Legislative Caucus.

References

External links
 Gregory Porter at ballotpedia.org
Follow the Money - Gregory W Porter
2006 2004 2002 2000 1998 1996 1994 campaign contributions

Democratic Party members of the Indiana House of Representatives
1955 births
Living people
Politicians from Indianapolis
Earlham College alumni
Harvard Kennedy School alumni
African-American state legislators in Indiana
21st-century American politicians
21st-century African-American politicians
20th-century African-American people